Nightline is an American late-night news program that airs on ABC.

Nightline may also refer to:

Nightline (Australian TV program), a 1992–2010 Australian news bulletin  television program which aired on Nine Network
Nightline (New Zealand TV programme), a 1990–2013 New Zealand late-night news bulletin television programme that aired on TV3 network
Nightline (student service), a confidential listening and information service run by university students for other university students
Nightline, a courier delivery company based in Dublin, Ireland.
Nightline (album), a 1983 album by Randy Crawford
Nightline (film), a Czech film